Sir Colin Nigel Callender  (born May 1952) is a British television, film and theater producer. He is the CEO at Playground Entertainment, a production company with offices in New York and London.

Early life and education
Callender was born to an Orthodox Jewish family in London, the son of Lydia and Martin Callender. He has a brother, Neeman, and a sister, Claire. Callender holds a BA with Honors in Philosophy and Politics from the University of East Anglia.

Career

Early career
Callender started in the entertainment industry as a member of Britain's National Youth Theatre and began his production career in 1974 at the Royal Court Theatre in London as stage manager working with directors such as Mike Leigh, David Hare and Sam Shepard. Later he joined Granada Television as a graduate trainee where he worked on Cat on a Hot Tin Roof the Granada co-production with NBC starring Natalie Wood, Robert Wagner and Laurence Olivier.

Primetime Television 
In 1978 Callender founded Primetime Television where he quickly established himself as one of the UK's leading television and film producers. At Primetime he pioneered the pre-selling and co-producing of UK drama with foreign broadcasters. When the UK's fourth network Channel Four was created, Primetime was the first independent production company to be commissioned by the new channel with the television adaptation of the RSC's groundbreaking nine-hour stage play The Life And Adventures of Nicholas Nickleby. It was Callender's first credit as a producer and he went on to win the Emmy Award for Outstanding Miniseries in a category that included other nominees The Winds of War and The Thorn Birds.

Other Primetime productions included D.H.Lawrence's The Captain’s Doll starring Jeremy Irons for the BBC and ARD Germany, Separate Tables starring Alan Bates and Julie Christie directed by John Schlesinger.

The Callender Company 
He later created The Callender Company and during this time, with productions like Peter Greenway's The Belly of an Architect which was the official British entry to the 1986 Cannes Film Festival, John Schlesinger's Madame Sousatzka starring Shirley MacLaine; The Bretts a 13-hour mini-series for Masterpiece Theatre, Prisoner of Honour starring Richard Dreyfuss and Mr. Halpern And Mr. Johnson starring Laurence Olivier and Jackie Gleeson, Callender was in the forefront of bringing together talent from the UK and the U.S., which has gone on to become one of the hallmarks of his career.

During this time Callender also created and produced the British cult hit The Last Resort which changed the face of late night television in the UK and launched the career of British TV personality Jonathan Ross.

HBO 
In 1987, Callender moved to the U.S. to become executive producer of HBO's newly formed East Coast production unit. HBO Showcase produced 27 films receiving widespread critical acclaim and earning HBO its first Emmy Award for drama. In 1996 Callender and HBO CEO Jeffrey Bewkes created the film division HBO NYC. Shortly thereafter he was appointed president of HBO Films, based in LA, which rapidly developed a reputation for consistently producing an award-winning slate of sophisticated and provocative television and feature films.

During his tenure Callender oversaw the production of over 115 award-winning movies and mini-series, among them:

 John Adams – the Tom Hanks produced, and Tom Hooper directed mini-series based on David McCullough's best-selling historical biography starring Paul Giamatti and Laura Linney, which won 13 Emmy awards and 4 Golden Globes, and still holds the record for the most wins for a programme in the history of the Emmy awards;
 Empire Falls – Fred Schepisi's star studded adaptation of Richard Russo's Pulitzer prize-winning novel starring Paul Newman and Joanne Woodward in their final roles together, along with Ed Harris, Philip Seymour Hoffman and Robin Wright Penn.
 Recount – Jay Roach's Emmy and Golden Globe winning recreation of the controversial events surrounding the Florida recount that decided the outcome of the 2000 election written by Danny Strong;
 Angels in America – Mike Nichol's acclaimed adaptation of Tony Kushner's Pulitzer Prize winning play, starring Al Pacino, Meryl Streep and Emma Thompson, which received 11 Emmy and 5 Golden Globe awards and which IndieWire recently anointed the best mini-series of the last century.

Callender was also responsible for HBO's theatrical films such as the breakout indie hit My Big Fat Greek Wedding and Gus Van Sant's provocative movie Elephant about a Columbine like high-school shooting which won him the Best Director Award as well as the coveted Palm d’Or at the 2003 Cannes Film Festival.

Under Callender's stewardship, HBO Films received:

 132 Emmy Awards (449 Nominations);
 The Emmy for Outstanding Movie or Mini-series 11 out of 14 years;
 39 Golden Globe Awards (116 Nominations);
 The Golden Globe for Best Movie or Mini-Series for 8 years in a row;
 11 Peabody Awards;
 13 Humanitas Awards; 
 5 Academy Awards;
 Top prizes at the Sundance Film Festival 4 years in a row;
 The Palm D’Or at the 2003 Cannes Film Festival.

Picturehouse 
Callender was also the driving force behind HBO's joint venture with New Line Cinema – the distribution company Picturehouse whose slate included Robert Altman's highly acclaimed Prairie Home Companion, Kit Kittredge: An American Girl, Run Fatboy Run, Rocket Science, Last Days, Mary Harron's The Notorious Bettie Page, JA Bayona's The Orphanage, Olivier Dahan's La Vie en Rose for which Marion Cotillard won the Academy Award for Best Actress, and Guillermo del Toro's Pan’s Labyrinth that won three Oscars at the 2006 Academy Awards.

Playground
In 2009, Callender left HBO Films and moved to New York to produce theatre. He founded Playground in 2012.

Theatre 
Playground's first stage production was Lucky Guy starring Tom Hanks by the late Nora Ephron, which tells the story of tabloid reporter Mike McAlary, winner of a 1998 Pulitzer Prize. It won two Tony Awards and had six nominations. In 2014, Callender produced Harvey Fierstein's Casa Valentina, which was nominated for four Tony Awards including Best Play, and Hedwig and the Angry Inch starring Neil Patrick Harris, which won four Tony Awards including Best Revival of a Musical. Callender also produced the production of Kenneth Branagh's New York stage debut in Macbeth at the Park Avenue Armory, and was a co-producer of Jez Butterworth's The River starring Hugh Jackman.

Recent Broadway productions include Dear Evan Hansen, which won six Tony Awards including Best Musical, and Robert Icke and Duncan Macmillan's 1984, based on the novel by George Orwell. Recent West End productions include Dreamgirls and The Glass Menagerie, both produced alongside Sonia Friedman Productions.

Alongside Sonia Friedman Productions and Harry Potter Theatrical Productions, Callender is one of the producers of the two-part stage play Harry Potter and the Cursed Child, an expansion of the Harry Potter franchise, which opened on 30 July 2016 in London's Palace Theatre. In 2017, Harry Potter and the Cursed Child won nine Olivier Awards, the biggest single win ever for one production in the history of the awards.  Harry Potter and the Cursed Child opened on Broadway on 22 April 2018 in the newly renovated Lyric Theatre and was nominated for ten Tony Awards and went on to win six, including Best Play. Harry Potter and the Cursed Child opened in Melbourne's Princess Theatre in early 2019, in San Francisco's Curran Theatre in the Fall of 2019, in Hamburg's Mehr! Theatre in 2020, in Toronto's CAA Ed Mirvish Theatre in 2022, and in Tokyo's TBS Akasaka Act Theatre in 2022.

Television 
Playground company has produced over 90 hours of television since inception. Series include the Golden Globe and Emmy nominated miniseries Dancing on the Edge for BBC and Starz, the Golden Globe and Emmy nominated miniseries The White Queen for BBC and Starz and its sequel The White Princess for Starz, the Golden Globe nominated anthology series The Missing for BBC and Starz, Dracula for NBC, Wolf Hall, a Golden Globe and BAFTA-winning six-part miniseries starring Mark Rylance, Damian Lewis and Claire Foy for BBC and Masterpiece, which was an adaptation of Hilary Mantel's Booker prize winning novels Wolf Hall and Bring Up the Bodies, and The Dresser, a television adaptation of Ronald Harwood's classic play starring Ian McKellen and Anthony Hopkins for BBC and Starz.

In 2017, Callender produced Academy Award winner Kenneth Lonergan's adaptation of Howards End for the BBC and Starz, Heidi Thomas's adaptation of Little Women for the BBC and Masterpiece, and Richard Eyre's adaptation of King Lear starring Anthony Hopkins and Emma Thompson for the BBC and Amazon Prime Video.

Callender produced Lucy Kirkwood's adaptation of her play Chimerica for Channel 4, and The Spanish Princess, a sequel to The White Queen and The White Princess, for Starz.

Callender currently produces the hit adaptation of James Herriot's All Creatures Great and Small for Channel 5 and Masterpiece on PBS, Peter Kosminsky's The Undeclared War starring Simon Pegg, Hannah Khalique-Brown, Adrian Lester and Mark Rylance for Channel 4 and Peacock, and a reimagining of the classic novel Dangerous Liaisons for Starz.

Credits

Primetime Television

Television

The Callender Company

Television

Feature films 

        Madame Sousatzka (1988)
        The Belly of an Architect (1987)

HBO 
Television Films

Television Miniseries

Feature Films

Playground 
Television

Theater

Awards and nominations

Personal life
He is married to attorney Elizabeth Gaine with whom he has two daughters, Caroline and Charlotte. He also has a son Ian from a previous marriage.

Callender was appointed Commander of the Order of the British Empire in the 2003 Birthday Honours for services to the UK film and television industries in the USA and was knighted in the 2016 New Year Honours for services to the British creative industries.

Callender is a trustee and supporter of the NYU Tisch School of the Arts, the New York Public Theater and The Creative Coalition. In the past, he has also been a trustee of the New York branch of the British Academy of Film and Television Arts.

References

External links
 http://www.emmys.tv/news/2006/kieser-award-colin-callender
 https://www.telegraph.co.uk/news/uknews/1435099/The-most-influential-Britons-in-America-30-21.html
 http://www.designing-media.com/interviews/ColinCallender

1952 births
Living people
Alumni of the University of East Anglia
British television producers
British media executives
English Jews
Commanders of the Order of the British Empire
Knights Bachelor
National Youth Theatre members